The House of the Doves (Spanish: La casa de las palomas, Italian: Un solo grande amore) is a 1972 Italian-Spanish drama film directed by Claudio Guerin and starring Ornella Muti, Lucia Bosé and Glen Lee.

The film's sets were designed by Ramiro Gómez.

Cast
 Ornella Muti as Sandra  
 Lucia Bosé  as Alexandra  
 Glen Lee  as Fernando  
 Carmen de Lirio  as Marilú  
 Caterina Boratto as Virginia  
 Luis Davila as Enrique  
 Blanca Sendino 
 Concha Goyanes  as María  
 Kiti Mánver  as Elisa  
 Fernando Sánchez Polack  as Sirviente de Fernando  
 Juana Azorín

References

Bibliography 
 Bentley, Bernard. A Companion to Spanish Cinema. Boydell & Brewer 2008.

External links 
 

1972 drama films
Italian drama films
Spanish drama films
1972 films
1970s Spanish-language films
Films directed by Claudio Guerin
Films scored by Francesco De Masi
1970s Italian films